Oriane Rebours (born 1 November 1988) is a French slalom canoeist who competed at the international level from 2011 to 2014.

She won a bronze medal in the C1 event at the 2014 ICF Canoe Slalom World Championships at Deep Creek Lake.

World Cup individual podiums

References

French female canoeists
Living people
1988 births
Medalists at the ICF Canoe Slalom World Championships